Congregation B'nai Israel is a historic synagogue at 401 W. Grand Street in Jackson, Tennessee, housing a Reform Jewish congregation.

The B'nai Israel congregation was chartered in 1885. In its early years, the congregation conducted services in some of homes of its members and in a hall above M. Tuchfeld's store (more recently known as Kisber's Department Store). The congregation moved into its first permanent home in 1897 when it acquired the former Cumberland Presbyterian Church building on College Street and rededicated it for Jewish worship. In 1907 the congregation chose to affiliate with Reform Judaism, becoming a member of the Union of American Hebrew Congregations.

The Cumberland Presbyterian Church building, continued to serve as the congregation's place of worship until 1941, when the current temple building was completed. Construction of the new building was funded with money accumulated in a building fund that had been started in 1924. The building was designed by Memphis architect Carl Heyer and constructed by Jackson building contractor Hubert Owen. Pews from the Cumberland Presbyterian Church building were installed in the new building; these pews are still in use. Classrooms were added to the building in 1962.

The temple was listed on the National Register of Historic Places in 2008.

References

External links
 

Reform synagogues in Tennessee
Jackson, Tennessee
Buildings and structures in Madison County, Tennessee
Synagogues on the National Register of Historic Places in Tennessee
National Register of Historic Places in Madison County, Tennessee
Synagogues completed in 1941